"The Day the World Went Away"  is a song by American industrial rock band Nine Inch Nails, released on July 20, 1999, as the lead single from their third studio album The Fragile (1999). The song was the band's first top-forty hit on the US Billboard Hot 100, peaking at number 17, which remains their highest-ever position on the chart.

Background
"The Day the World Went Away" contains no drums. It was the only single credited to Reznor to reach the top 20 on the Billboard Hot 100 until "Old Town Road" hit number one in 2019. The song was a staple in the encore during the Fragility tour, and has been performed in many shows since.

The compact disc single contains three songs: the original version and a "quiet" remix of "The Day the World Went Away" and "Starfuckers, Inc.", another song from The Fragile. The 12" vinyl single replaced "Starfuckers, Inc." with another version of "The Day the World Went Away", this one remixed by the electronic music duo Porter Ricks. The main version of the title track featured on the single is approximately 30 seconds shorter than the version found on The Fragile and features slightly different vocals.

The version of "Starfuckers, Inc." featured on the single is almost identical to the album version, except that this version ends with the sound of Paul Stanley yelling "Goodnight!" to a cheering crowd. The yelling and crowd cheering are sampled from a KISS concert recording. The opening to "Complication", the track which follows "Starfuckers, Inc." on The Fragile, can be heard faintly alongside the crowd noise, augmented to sound like part of the concert.

The flower depicted on the cover of the single is a Kangaroo paw.

Music video

A music video was made for the song, but never released. Still images that were used on the official NIN website indicate that the video takes place at a funeral.

An alternate video for the song, using live audio and a combination of live and original footage, is included as an Easter egg on the second disc of the And All That Could Have Been DVD.

In popular culture
A remixed version of the song was featured in the third theatrical trailer of Terminator Salvation. It is also used again in the television series Person of Interest, from the episode of the same name.

The song is featured in the 2012 video game Spec Ops: The Line.

An orchestral version arranged by Ramin Djawadi was used in the trailer for the fourth season of Westworld.

Formats and track listings

CD single
Nothing Records / Interscope Records INTDS-97026
"The Day the World Went Away" (single version) – 4:03
"Starfuckers, Inc." (long) – 5:24
"The Day the World Went Away (Quiet)" (remixed by Trent Reznor) – 6:20

12" single
Nothing Records / Interscope Records INT12-97026

Side A
"The Day the World Went Away" (single version) – 4:01
"The Day the World Went Away (Quiet)" – 6:20

Side B
"The Day the World Went Away (Porter Ricks)" – 7:04

Charts

Year-end charts

Decade-end charts

References

External links
Nine Inch Nails' official site
The Day The World Went Away at the NinWiki
Halo 13 at NINCollector.com
"The Day the World Went Away" (US CD5") at Discogs.com
"The Day the World Went Away" (US 12") at Discogs.com

1999 singles
Ambient songs
Art rock songs
Nine Inch Nails songs
Nothing Records singles
Song recordings produced by Trent Reznor
Song recordings produced by Alan Moulder
Songs written by Trent Reznor
1999 songs